The Green Monster was the name of several vehicles built by Art Arfons and his half brother Walt Arfons. These ranged from dragsters to a turbojet-powered car which briefly held the land speed record three times during 1964 and 1965.

The land speed record Green Monster set the absolute record three times during the close competition of 1964 and 1965. It was powered by a General Electric J79 taken from an F-104 Starfighter. The jet engine had a four-stage afterburner.

Early dragsters
The first Green Monster appeared in 1952. It was a three-wheeled dragster powered by an Oldsmobile six cylinder engine, and painted with left-over green tractor paint. The name was applied on the car's first outing by the track announcer, Ed Piasczik (Paskey), who laughingly said "Okay folks here it comes; The Green Monster", and it stuck to all Arfons' creations.

Green Monster 2 was painted by Arfons' mother to resemble the World War II Curtiss P-40 Flying Tigers fighter airplane, with an open mouth showing large teeth. Running on passenger car tires, the car required four wheels on the rear drive axle to withstand the power.

The later cars had various paint schemes where green was not necessarily the dominant color. The six-wheeled Green Monster 6 became the first dragster to break  in the quarter mile. Green Monster 11, Art Arfons' favorite, hit  to beat Don Garlits.

Arfons used an Allison V1710 in several Green Monsters.

Land speed racing 

The Arfons brothers then split up, and each became interested in land speed racing.

The most famous Green Monster was powered by a surplus F-104 Starfighter General Electric J79 jet engine, producing  static thrust  with four-stage afterburner, which Arfons purchased from a scrap dealer for $600 and rebuilt himself, over the objections of General Electric and the government, and despite all manuals for the engine being classified top secret.

The engine had been scrapped because of damage caused by ingesting a bolt. Arfons removed 60 blades out of approximately 1000 in the engine, removing broken blades and their counterparts at 180 degrees, or the pair at +/-120 degrees to maintain balance. He tested it by tying it to trees in his garden, a procedure which drew complaints from his neighbors.

In 1966, Arfons returned once again to Bonneville, but reached an average speed of only . On run number seven at 8:03 a.m. on November 17, Arfons crashed his vehicle travelling  when a wheel bearing seized. He subsequently built another Green Monster land speed record car, but sold it to California rancher Slick Gardner without ever driving it.

Later vehicles
In view of his wife's concern over the risk involved in land speed record racing, Arfons instead turned his talents to turbine powered tractor pulling with great success, fielding a series of Green Monster tractor pullers, along with his son and daughter.

In 1991 he tried again, but once again had to give up with handling problems.

In popular culture 
This article was the topic of conversation in the second episode of series two of the web series "Two Of These People Are Lying" hosted by The Technical Difficulties.

References

External links

Jet land speed record cars